Echo of a Dream was a 1930 German-Romanian musical film directed by Martin Berger, based on the novel Ciuleandra by Liviu Rebreanu. It premiered on 20 October 1930. It was Romania's first sound film, and only a fragment remains.

Cast
 Maly Delschaft as Madalina
 Hans Stüwe as Puiu Faranga and Mironescu
 Elvira Godeanu as Anita
 Maria Forescu as Madalina's mother

References

External links
 

1930 films
1930 musical films
German musical films
Lost German films
1930s German-language films
Romanian-language films
Films based on Romanian novels
Films based on works by Liviu Rebreanu
Romanian musical films
Romanian black-and-white films
German black-and-white films
1930 lost films
Lost musical films
1930 multilingual films
German multilingual films
Romanian multilingual films
1930s German films